The Ctistae or Ktistai were a group/class among the Mysians of ancient Thracian culture.

The Mysians avoided consuming any living thing, and therefore lived on such foodstuffs as milk and honey. For this reason, they were referred to as "god-fearing" and "capnobatae" (kapnobatai) or "smoke-treading".

The Ctistae were a class of Mysians who not only observed these dietary restrictions, but abstained from cohabitating with women. They led celibate lives, never marrying. They were held in a place of honor by the Thracians, with their lives being dedicated to the gods. They are described by Strabo, sourcing Poseidonius.

According to Strabo, whether they took up celibacy or not they were collectively called Hippemolgi ("mare-milkers"), Galactophagi ("living on milk") or Abii ("not living (with women)").

Comparative analysis
Strabo, in the same section notes that the Greeks confounded the Mysians with the Getae (or Geto-Dacians).

That the Ctistae described by Strabo might be equivalent to the Polistai among the Dacians mentioned by Josephus in the Antiquities of the Jews Book 18, Chapter 1 paragraph 5 has been noted  early on by Scaliger (d. 1609). He conjectured that some of the ascetics lived in groups and lived in  buildings, hence the distinction of being called Polistai "City-Dwellers" .

References

Thracian religion
Celibacy
Religious orders